Micropolypodium is a genus of ferns in the family Polypodiaceae, subfamily Grammitidoideae, according to the Pteridophyte Phylogeny Group classification of 2016 (PPG I).

It is native to China, Japan, and the Philippines.

Species
Neotropical (the Americas) species formerly placed in the genus have been reclassified to Moranopteris.

Micropolypodium now contains the following species according to the Checklist of Ferns and Lycophytes of the World :
Micropolypodium okuboi (Yatabe) Hayata
Micropolypodium pulogense (Copel.) A.R.Sm.
Micropolypodium sikkimense (Hieron.) X.C.Zhang

References

Polypodiaceae
Fern genera
Taxonomy articles created by Polbot